Puiseaux is a commune in the Loiret department in north-central France.

Mayors
11 November 1833 - Antoine Jules Dumesnil, Senator of Loiret from 1876 to 1888
11 October 1891 - Jules Boudin, prior to 1891, mayor of the commune of Puiseaux
12 July 1803 - Eugène Bordry, prior to 1903, as mayor of the commune of Puiseaux
12 December 1919 - Gaétan Barbe
21 May 1922 - Émile Tinet, prior to 1922, as mayor of the commune of Puiseaux
 The data from 1946 to 1973 are not yet available
1973–present - Pierre Frérot

See also
Communes of the Loiret department

References

Communes of Loiret